Lat Yao is a district (amphoe) of Nakhon Sawan province, central Thailand.

History
Originally, Lat Yao was part of Krok Phra district. Khun Lat Boriban (ขุนลาดบริบาล), the head of the tambon, developed the infrastructure of the tambon. In 1913, he proposed to the governor of Nakhon Sawan that the tambon should be upgraded to a district. The project was approved and the new district created.

Geography
Neighboring districts are (from the north clockwise): Khanu Woralaksaburi of Kamphaeng Phet province, Banphot Phisai, Mueang Nakhon Sawan and Krok Phra of Nakhon Sawan Province, Sawang Arom of Uthai Thani province, and Chum Ta Bong and Mae Wong of Nakhon Sawan.

Environment
The Sakrae Krang River flows through the district. The Department of Royal Irrigation (RID) has declared its intention to build a dam on the river in the district. The dam has attracted significant local opposition. Opponents have rejected four health and environment impact assessments (EHIA), pointing out that they fail to address mitigation and the impact on the forest ecology.

Administration
The district is divided into 12 sub-districts (tambons), which are further subdivided into 149 villages (mubans). Lat Yao and Sanchao Kai To are two townships (thesaban tambon), each covering parts of the same-named tambon.  There are a further 12 tambon administrative organizations (TAO).

Places
Wat Khao Samuk

In media
Lat Yao, especially Nong Nom Wua, was the backdrop for 2015's popular TV drama, Channel 3's Sud Kaen Saen Ruk.

References

Lat Yao